

Aircraft

References

Republic of Korea Army